A time limit or deadline is a narrow field of time, or a particular point in time, by which an objective or task must be accomplished. Once that time has passed, the item may be considered overdue (e.g., for work projects or school assignments). In the case of work assignments or projects that are not completed by the deadline, this may adversely affect the employee's performance rating. In the case of school assignments, essays or reports submitted after the deadline, marks or grades may be deducted from the student's assessment.

In some cases, no materials can be submitted after the deadline. This may occur with calls for proposal, commercial tenders for bids, and application dates for universities and professional schools. For tests and examinations in schools, universities and job competitions, once the time limit for the test is up, the test-takers must put down their pens or pencils and hand in their test.

In project management, deadlines are most often associated with milestones.

Etymology
There is only indirect evidence that the term deadline in the sense of "due date" may be connected with the use of the term in prison camps during the American Civil War, when it referred to a physical line or boundary beyond which prisoners were shot. In fact, the term is no longer found in print by the end of the 19th century, but it soon resurfaces in writing in 1917 as a printing term for "a guideline on the bed of a printing press beyond which text will not print". Three years later, the term is found in print in the sense of "time limit" in the closely connected publishing industry, indicating the time after which material would not make it into a newspaper or periodical.

Further reading 
The Deadline Effect: How to Work Like It's the Last Minute-Before the Last Minute, book by journalist Christopher Cox

References 

Limittimes.com

Planning
Schedule (project management)